Puka Q'asa (Quechua puka red, q'asa mountain pass, "red mountain pass", also spelled Pucaccasa) is a mountain in the Huancavelica Region in Peru, about  high. Puka Q'asa lies southwest of a mountain named Yawarqucha, east of Chuqlluqucha. The little lake northwest of Puka Q'asa is Wachwaqucha ("Andean goose lake").

References 

Mountains of Peru
Mountains of Huancavelica Region